Gillian Blake (born 10 May 1949), Buckingham, England is a retired British actress who became well known in the early 1970s as Dora in Follyfoot.

Blake studied acting at the Guildhall School of Music and Drama and began her professional career in the late 1960s. She appeared in the 1969 film Goodbye Mr. Chips. She went on to perform additional roles on television. In 1971 she landed the lead role in a Yorkshire Television Production Follyfoot, which ran for three series until 1973. Her last role of note was in two episodes of the BBC2 Playhouse series in 1980.

Since then she has retired from acting, having spent some years concentrating on motherhood. She made a rare television appearance on This Is Your Life in 1995, celebrating the career of Desmond Llewelyn (her co-star in Follyfoot). In 1977 she married actor Peter Whitbread after meeting him on the set of Follyfoot. They had a son Jake.

References

External links

The Follyfoot Fan Tribute Site
The Follyfoot forum

1949 births
Living people
English television actresses
English film actresses
Alumni of the Guildhall School of Music and Drama
People from Dereham
People from Buckingham
20th-century English actresses